The , formally called , often abbreviated as HHF, is a concert hall located in Fukui, Fukui, Japan.

Summary 

The acoustics for the hall were designed by Nagata Acoustics, while Nikken Sekkei carried out its general design.

Facilities 
The building of the Harmony Hall Fukui houses a large main hall, small chamber music hall, and rehearsal rooms.

Main hall 
The shoebox-style main hall has seating capacity of 1,456. A large concert pipe organ made by Karl Schuke GmbH. has set up in the centre rear of the Hall since the improvements carried out in 2004. This instrument has 70 stops and 5,014 pipes.

Small hall 
The small chamber music hall has seating capacity of 610.

Access 
Three minutes walk from Harmony Hall Station (Fukui Railway Fukubu Line)
Fukui Railway Bus Harmony Hall-mae Bus Stop

See also 
List of concert halls

References

External links 
 Official Website

Concert halls in Japan
Buildings and structures completed in 1997
Fukui (city)
Music venues completed in 1997
Buildings and structures in Fukui Prefecture